The 2014 SCTV Awards honored the popular in Indonesian television program and music. The ceremony awards was held at the Studio 6 in Daan Mogot, West Jakarta, on November 29, 2014, and was broadcast on SCTV. It was hosted by Andhika Pratama, Narji, Audi Marissa, and Gading Marten. The ceremony awards were attendees included Syahrini, Wali, Geisha, and others.

This year edition of ceremony awards were adding for three new categories, are Most Famous Young Artist, Most Famous Soap Opera Soundtrack and Most Favorite Social Media Artist. A Lifetime Achievement Award was also presented back.

Winners and nominees
The nominees were announced in November 2014. The winners are listed on boldface.

References

External links
 Liputan6.com: SCTV Awards

2014 film awards
2014 television awards
2014 music awards
2014 in Indonesian television